James L. Heskett is an American academic. He is the UPS Foundation Professor of Business Logistics, Emeritus at the Harvard Business School.

Early life
James L. Heskett earned a PhD from the Stanford Graduate School of Business.

Career
Heskett first taught at the Ohio State University. In 1965, he joined the faculty at the Harvard Business School. He has also been the senior associate dean for educational programs at the HBS. In this capacity, he helped reduce the workload for MBAs, on the assumption that they had previously been bombarded with too much information they could not take in.

Heskett is the co-author of seven books and the sole author of one more book. In his 1992 book called Corporate Culture and Performance, co-authored with his HBS colleague John Kotter, Heskett studied 200 companies and concluded that adaptable corporate cultures led to higher financial returns.

He is also a prolific case writer and also featured on the list of The Case Centre's all-time top authors list (covering 40 years) released in 2014.

Works

References

Living people
Stanford Graduate School of Business alumni
Ohio State University faculty
Harvard Business School faculty
Year of birth missing (living people)